Rosalind Goodrich Bates (July 29, 1894 – November 14, 1961) was an American lawyer and clubwoman, based in Los Angeles, California. She was a founder and president of the International Federation of Women Lawyers (FIDA).

Early life and education 
Rosalind Anita Goodrich Boido was born in 1894, in Sonsonate, El Salvador, the daughter of Norberto Lorenzo Boido Basozabal and Rosa Meador Goodrich Boido. Her father was born in Mexico and her mother was from Texas. Both parents were physicians; her mother was also active as a suffragist and temperance worker in Arizona. Rosalind Goodrich attended the University of Arizona, and graduated from the University of Oregon, where she earned a bachelor's degree in 1917 and a master's degree in 1918. She earned a law degree from Southwestern Law School in Los Angeles, and passed the Califorrnia bar in 1926, "one of the first Latina lawyers in the United States."

Career 
After early work as an editor and actress in New York, Bates was a trial lawyer in Los Angeles. She was president of the California Business Women's Council, and also of the Los Angeles Business Women's Council, and active in the Los Angeles Women's Club. She was vice-president of the Los Angeles Lawyers Club and headed the international department of the Women's University Club. "Every woman lawyer who actually earns her living in the practice of law is an exceptional woman," she declared in 1932. "To survive the hard grind of study, and the worst grind of private practice or the demands of public office, requires good health, good brains, and most important, good luck."

Bates was an officer of the National Association of Women Lawyers, and organized the group's national gatherings in Los Angeles in 1935 and 1939. In 1944 she was a founder of the International Federation of Women Lawyers (FIDA); in 1949 she was president of FIDA. She edited and wrote essays for The Women Lawyers’ Journal. In 1952, she testified before the President's Commission on Naturalization and Immigration, on the subject of adoption, immigration, and citizenship procedures for Japanese-American "war babies". She ran unsuccessfully for a seat on the Los Angeles Board of Education in 1953. She was the first woman to serve on the board of directors of the Southwestern Alumni Association.

Personal life 
Rosalind Goodrich married writer and editor Ernest Sutherland Bates in 1913. They had two sons, Roland and Vernon, before they divorced in 1919. She married her college drama co-star, blind writer Leslie Burton Blades, in 1919; they divorced in 1923. Her son Roland, her law partner, died in 1958, and her mother died in 1959.

Death 
Rosalind Goodrich Bates died in 1961, aged 67 years, shot to death at her home in Silver Lake. One suspect was a man involved in a custody battle with one of Bates' clients; he was arrested but later cleared. Her murder remains unsolved.

References

External links 
A 1935 photograph of Bates with four other women lawyers and judges, including Oda Faulconer and Burnita Shelton Matthews, from the Los Angeles Times Photographic Collection at UCLA

1894 births
1961 deaths
American women lawyers
American people of Mexican descent
American people of Italian descent
People from Sonsonate Department
Clubwomen
Southwestern Law School alumni
University of Oregon alumni
American murder victims
Salvadoran emigrants to the United States